The deep branch of the ulnar nerve is a terminal, primarily motor branch of the ulnar nerve. It is accompanied by the deep palmar branch of ulnar artery.

Structure
It passes between the abductor digiti minimi and the flexor digiti minimi brevis. It then perforates the opponens digiti minimi and follows the course of the deep palmar arch beneath the flexor tendons. As the deep ulnar nerve passes across the palm, it lies in a fibrous tunnel formed between the hook of the hamate and the pisiform (Guyon's canal).

Function
At its origin it innervates the hypothenar muscles. As it crosses the deep part of the hand, it innervates all the interosseous muscles and the third and fourth lumbricals. It ends by innervating the adductor pollicis and the medial (deep) head of the flexor pollicis brevis. It also sends articular filaments to the wrist-joint (following Hilton's law)

References

External links
 

Nerves of the upper limb